"Sealed with a Kiss" is a song made popular by Brian Hyland and Jason Donovan.

Sealed with a Kiss may also refer to:

 Sealed with a Kiss (Bobby Vinton album), a 1972 album by Bobby Vinton
 Sealed with a Kiss (The Eyeliners album), a 2001 album by The Eyeliners
 Sealed with a Kiss, a 1962 album by Brian Hyland
 Romeo & Juliet: Sealed with a Kiss, a 2006 American animated film by Phil Nibbelink
 Sealed with a Kiss (2011 TV series), a 2011 Chinese television series 
 Sealed with a Kiss (2015 TV series), a 2015 Singaporean television series

The acronym SWAK may refer to:
 "SWAK", episode of the American police television series  NCIS (season 2) 
 "S.W.A.K.",  episode of the American animated TV series Rocko's Modern Life
 Swak na Swak, a Philippine television show
 Miswak, a teeth-cleaning twig

See also
 Seal It with a Kiss (disambiguation)